"Désir" (Desire) is a song by Japanese pop rock duo Garnidelia. It was released as the unit's seventh single on August 23, 2017. It reached number 14 on Oricon and number 19 on Japan Hot 100. It was used as the ending theme song for the anime series Fate/Apocrypha.

Release
On 6 May 2017, the official website of the anime Fate/Apocrypha revealed about the theme song for the show, including the ending song "Désir" that would be sung by Garnidelia. The song was released as a single on 23 August 2017 in three editions; Regular edition, Limited edition and Limited anime edition. The single reached number 14 on Oricon, 19 on Japan Hot 100, and 7 on Japan Hot Animation with spent 6, 3 and 2 weeks respectively. The song was featured in their third album "G.R.N.D.".

Music video
The music video for "Désir" was directed by Shin Okawa. The video tell a story about a human girl enamored of a creature similar to a fawn. The mythological being, who also likes to see her in the woods, for the obvious reasons, is not of the likes of the people as they attempt to separate him from the young lady. The girl in this video is started to falling in the love with the creature, although her father is not allow her to see him again. Some scene show toku play the piano in a house, and Maria sing in a forest with using blue dress. The video end in a scene when the girl is died after she was shot by the hunters when she was trying to protect the creature, and the creature cried because of her death.

Track listing
All tracks written by Maria.

Regular edition

Limited edition

Limited anime edition

Personnel
Garnidelia
Maria – vocals
toku  – music

Bands
Rock Sakurai   - bass
Takeo Kajiwara - guitar
junchi.        - drums
Ayako Himata, Reiko Tsuchiya  - violin and viola

Production
Kimihiro Nakase – recording
Satoshi Hosoi – mixer
Hiromichi Takiguchi – mastering

Charts

Release history

Notes

References

Garnidelia songs
2017 singles
Songs with music by Mai Mizuhashi
Anime songs
2017 songs